Baijnath Assembly constituency is one of the 68 constituencies in the Himachal Pradesh Legislative Assembly. Himachal Pradesh a northern state of India is known for its beauty and serene and Religious persona. Baijnath which is named after Jyotirlinga of Vaidyanath is also part of Kangra Lok Sabha constituency.

Members of Legislative Assembly

Election candidate

2022

Election results

2017

See also
 Kangra district
 List of constituencies of Himachal Pradesh Legislative Assembly

References

External links
 

Assembly constituencies of Himachal Pradesh
Kangra district